is a Japanese quarterly beadwork magazine published by  since 2003. The magazine has its headquarters in Tokyo. It targets women.

See also
Arts and crafts
Bead
Decorative arts
Jewelry designer

References

2003 establishments in Japan
Beadwork
Hobby magazines
Magazines established in 2003
Magazines published in Tokyo
Quarterly magazines
Women's magazines published in Japan